USS Colington is a name used more than once by the U.S. Navy:

 The first Colington (YFB-43), formerly Elmer W. Jones, served in a noncommissioned status in the 5th Naval District during World War II.
  was launched 13 January 1945 by American Bridge Co., Ambridge, Pennsylvania.

References 

United States Navy ship names